Grigoriy Aleksandrovich Yegorov (born January 12, 1967, in Shymkent) is a pole vault athlete from the former USSR. After the dissolution of the Soviet Union, he became citizen of Kazakhstan. In 1996 he moved to the Alicante province in Spain. He got the Spanish nationality in 2012. He is currently representing Spain in World Master Championships.

Biography
Yegorov trained at Dynamo in Alma-Ata. He won the 1988 Olympic bronze medal (competing for the USSR), two World Indoor silver medals, and finished second at the 1993 World Championships in Athletics with a personal best jump of 5.90 metres. His last international medal came at the 2003 Asian Championships, jumping 5.40 metres.

Competition record

External links 
 

1967 births
Living people
People from Shymkent
Soviet male pole vaulters
Kazakhstani male pole vaulters
Dynamo sports society athletes
Olympic athletes of the Soviet Union
Olympic athletes of Kazakhstan
Athletes (track and field) at the 1988 Summer Olympics
Athletes (track and field) at the 2004 Summer Olympics
Olympic bronze medalists for the Soviet Union
Asian Games medalists in athletics (track and field)
World Athletics Championships medalists
Athletes (track and field) at the 1994 Asian Games
Athletes (track and field) at the 2002 Asian Games
European Athletics Championships medalists
Olympic bronze medalists in athletics (track and field)
Goodwill Games medalists in athletics
Asian Games gold medalists for Kazakhstan
Asian Games silver medalists for Kazakhstan
Medalists at the 1994 Asian Games
Medalists at the 2002 Asian Games
World Athletics Indoor Championships medalists
Medalists at the 1988 Summer Olympics
Competitors at the 1990 Goodwill Games